Viscusi is a surname. Notable people with the surname include:

Stephen Viscusi, American author, columnist and broadcast journalist 
W. Kip Viscusi (born 1949), American economist